WCXO (96.7 FM) is a radio station licensed to Carlyle, Illinois, United States.  The station is currently owned by Clinton County Broadcasting.

References

External links

CXO